The year 1676 in music involved some significant events.

Events
Construction of the Teatro San Angelo in Venice is completed.
Giuseppe Ottavio Pitoni arrives in Rieti.

Publications
 Thomas Mace – Musick's Monument

Published popular music

Classical music
 Johann Jakob Walther – Scherzi da Violino solo con il basso continuo
Isabella Leonarda – Motetti a voce sola, Op.6
Johann Christoph Bach – Meine Freundin, du bist schön
Dietrich Buxtehude – Jesu dulcis memoria, BuxWV 56
Nicola Matteis – Ayres for the Violin, Books 1 and 2 (Containing Diverse bizzarie sopra la vecchia sarabanda o pur ciaccona)
Giovanni Legrenzi – Cantate e canzonette, Op.12
Johann Caspar Kerll 
Canzona in C major
Ciacona in C major
 Marc-Antoine Charpentier – Circé, H.496
 Nicolas Lebègue – Livre d'orgue No.1
 Esaias Reusner – Neue Lauten-Früchte
Alessandro Stradella – S. Giovanni Battista, G.3.3
Heinrich Biber – Sonatae tam aris quam aulis servientes
Johann Philipp Krieger – Passacaglia in D minor
Giovanni Battista Bassani – La Tromba della Divina misericordia

Opera
Jean-Baptiste Lully 
Atys
Isis
Antonio Sartorio – Giulio Cesare in Egitto

Births
January 19 – John Weldon, musician (died 1736)
February 4 – Giacomo Facco, violinist, conductor and composer (died 1753)
April 4 – Giuseppe Maria Orlandini, opera composer (died 1760)
May 23 – Johann Bernhard Bach, composer, cousin of Johann Sebastian Bach (died 1749)

Deaths
January 14 – Francesco Cavalli, Italian composer (born 1602)
June 7 – Paul Gerhardt, Germany's best-known hymn-writer (born 1606)
October 6 – Claudia Rusca, singer, composer and organist (born 1593)
October 10 – Sebastian Knüpfer, composer (born 1633)

References

 
17th century in music
Music by year